Viasa Flight 742 was an international, scheduled passenger flight from Caracas, Venezuela to Miami International Airport with an intermediate stopover in Maracaibo, Venezuela that crashed on 16 March 1969. After taking off on the Maracaibo to Miami leg, the DC-9-30 hit a series of power lines before crashing into the La Trinidad section of Maracaibo. All 84 people on board perished, as well as 71 on the ground.

Aircraft 
The DC-9 involved in the crash was on lease from Avensa and had only been in service for a month. It was only three months old at the time of the accident and was powered by two Pratt & Whitney JT8D-7 turbofan engines.

Accident 
The first leg of the flight, from Caracas to Maracaibo, carried 57 people; 42 passengers and 10 crew members. The flight crew of the first leg consisted of two captains: Harry Gibson and Emiliano Savelli Maldonado.

The aircraft arrived at Maracaibo at 10:30. There captain Gibson disembarked and captain Maldonado became the pilot in command.

Flight 742 began its takeoff roll at 12:00. As the DC-9 headed toward Ziruma, it failed to gain altitude, and the plane's left engine struck a power pole. As the plane banked left, a reflector struck the fuel tank, spilling fuel. After hitting another power pole, the plane's left wing was ripped off the plane and the left engine exploded into flames. The plane crashed in a small park in La Trinidad. The impact was so hard that the right engine was torn off the plane and impacted a house.

Notable people 
One of the people who perished in the Viasa Flight 742 crash was San Francisco Giants pitching prospect Néstor Chávez.

Investigation 
The cause of the crash was attributed to faulty sensors along the runway and take-off calculations made from erroneous information, which resulted in the aircraft being overloaded by more than 5,000 pounds for the prevailing conditions. Only two days after the crash, Venezuela's Public Works Minister ascribed runway length as a contributing factor in the disaster.

Aftermath 
Flight 742 was the first loss of a DC-9-30, and it remains the deadliest accident involving that type of aircraft. It was also the deadliest accident in Venezuela until West Caribbean Airways Flight 708 (operated by a McDonnell Douglas MD-80, the DC-9's successor aircraft) crashed over thirty-six years later.  At the time, the crash was the world's deadliest civil air disaster. The fatality total was surpassed in 1971 by All Nippon Airways Flight 58, which killed 162 people after colliding with an F-86 fighter jet.

References 

742
Aviation accidents and incidents in 1969
Aviation accidents and incidents in Venezuela
Accidents and incidents involving the McDonnell Douglas DC-9
Airliner accidents and incidents caused by pilot error
1969 in Venezuela
Events in Maracaibo
Zulia
March 1969 events in South America
1969 disasters in Venezuela